Subang is a town and the capital of the Subang Regency in West Java, Indonesia. The district had a population of 120,346 in 2010 which grew to 137,284 at the 2020 Census; the official estimate as at mid 2021 was 139,046.

History
In April 1952 the Harian Rakjat stated that the Communist Party of Indonesia had organized a course in Subang along with Karawang.

Landmarks
The government office Dinas Kesehatan Kabupaten Subang, the House of Representatives of Subang District, the park Alun Alun Kabupaten Subang, and Al-Musabaqoh Grand Mosque are in the town centre. The University of Subang is in the southeast and the football pitch Stadion Persikas lies in the south of the town. P. T. Taekwung Industrial Estate lies on the northeastern outskirts of the town as does a Class II prison in the north. The principal hospital is Rumah Sakit PTPN VIII Hospital.

Museum Wisma Karya is a colonial period building and museum in Subang. It contains a range of items from ancient fossils to a bronze statue of P.W. Hofland, which was made in 1878.

Climate
Subang has a borderline tropical rainforest climate (Af) and tropical monsoon climate (Am) with exactly  in the driest month, August. It has moderate rainfall from June to September and heavy to very heavy rainfall from October to May.

References

External links

Subang Regency
Districts of West Java
Regency seats of West Java
Populated places in West Java